The 1956 Arizona Wildcats baseball team represented the University of Arizona in the 1956 NCAA baseball season. The Wildcats played their home games at UA Field and Hi Corbett Field in Tucson, Arizona. The team was coached by Frank Sancet in his seventh season at Arizona.

The Wildcats reached the College World Series, finishing as the runner up to Minnesota.

Roster

Schedule

Notes

References 

Arizona
Arizona Wildcats baseball seasons
College World Series seasons
Arizona Baseball
Border Conference baseball champion seasons